"Bankroll" is a song by American DJ Diplo. It features rappers Rich Brian, Rich the Kid and Young Thug. Originally, Justin Bieber was featured on the song, but due to Bieber already having exclusives with DJ Khaled ("I'm the One") and David Guetta ("2U") at around the same time as Diplo released "Bankroll", Diplo was forced to remove the original from his SoundCloud account. Diplo replaced Bieber's verse with a verse from Rich Brian.

References 

2017 songs
Songs written by Diplo
Songs written by Justin Bieber
Songs written by Young Thug
Young Thug songs